Gironniera parvifolia is a tree in the family Cannabaceae endemic to Sri Lanka.

In culture
"Ak mediya" (Sinhala)

References

 http://www.theplantlist.org/tpl/record/kew-2826180
 http://www.theplantlist.org/tpl/record/kew-2826174
 https://www.gbif.org/species/109439792

Cannabaceae
Endemic flora of Sri Lanka